San Juan District is one of twenty-one districts of the province Lucanas in Peru.

References